Saint-Jules is a parish municipality in the Beauce-Centre Regional County Municipality in the Chaudière-Appalaches region of Quebec, Canada. Its population was 547 as of the Canada 2021 Census. It is named after Pope Julius I.

Demographics 

Population
Population trend:

Notable people 
 Janvier Grondin, Coalition Avenir Québec politician
 Placide Poulin, businessman

References

Commission de toponymie du Québec
Ministère des Affaires municipales, des Régions et de l'Occupation du territoire

Parish municipalities in Quebec
Incorporated places in Chaudière-Appalaches